Birds described in 1902 include  American black duck, Archer's ground robin, Great Nicobar serpent eagle, black-chested tyrant, Mussau fantail, Blanford's lark, Arabian serin, Cherrie's antwren, Isthmian wren, red-throated alethe,

Events 
Death of  Andreas Reischek, Chester Barlow, Ludwig Kumlien 
Philip Sclater supports Michael John Nicoll's membership of the British Ornithologists' Union
Alwin Karl Haagner begins publishing in The Ibis

Publications
Sergei Buturlin Waders of the Russian Empire. Kuliki Rossieskoi Imperie—Premiya-k-Journal -Psovaia i Rujeinaia.Ohota.Tula, 1902.
Joseph Grinnell Pacific Coast Avifauna.—No.3. Check-list of Californian Birds. By Joseph Grinnell. Cooper Ornithological Club of California. Santa Clara,June 1902. Roy. 8vo. 98 pp.
William Robert Ogilvie-Grant A Review of the Species of Shrikes of the Genus Lanius. Nov. Zool. ix. p. 449.
Karl Alfred von Zittel Text-book of Palaeontology vol. ii. English edition,translated and edited by Charles E. Eastman, Ph.D. Vol. II. London :Macmillan.online BHL
Valentin Bianchi Ornitologisclieskie roaterialui expeditzi dla naooschno-promislnvago izsladomanya Murmana 1899-1901.  [Ornithological Materials of the Expedition for the Scientific-industrial Exploration of Murman in 1899-1901.] Ann. Mus. Zool. Acad. Imp. Sci. de St. Petersbourg, vii. 1902.
Robert Ridgway, 1902-1919 [1941, 1946]  The birds of North and Middle America : a descriptive catalogue of the higher groups, genera, species, and subspecies of birds known to occur in North America, from the Arctic lands to the Isthmus of Panama, the West Indies and other islands of the Caribbean sea, and the Galapagos Archipelago Washington Govt. Print. Off. online BHL

Ongoing events
Osbert Salvin and Frederick DuCane Godman 1879–1904. Biologia Centrali-Americana. Aves
Members of the German Ornithologists' Society in Journal für Ornithologie online BHL
The Ibis
Novitates Zoologicae
Ornithologische Monatsberichte Verlag von R. Friedländer & Sohn, Berlin. Years of publication: 1893–1938 online Zobodat
Ornis; internationale Zeitschrift für die gesammte Ornithologie.Vienna 1885-1905   online BHL
Anton Reichenow Die Vögel Afrikas Neudamm, J. Neumann,1900-05 online BHL
The Auk online BHL

References

Bird
Birding and ornithology by year